Radyera is a genus of flowering plants in the family Malvaceae.

Species include:
Radyera farragei (F.Muell.) Fryxell & S.H.Hashmi - Desert Rose Mallow, Bush Hibiscus 
Radyera urens (L.f.) Bullock

The genus was first formally described by A.A. Bullock in the Kew Bulletin in 1957.

References

Hibisceae
Malvaceae genera